Red Oak Township is an inactive township in Lawrence County, in the U.S. state of Missouri.

Red Oak Township was named after a creek of the same name where red oak timber was abundant.

References

Townships in Missouri
Townships in Lawrence County, Missouri